Costas N. Papanicolas is a nuclear and particle physicist with over 35 years' experience as a researcher, an educator and a scientific administrator. He received his B.Sc. in physics and PhD in nuclear physics from the Massachusetts Institute of Technology (MIT) in the USA. His research interests are in the fields of hadronic physics, solar energy and energy policy.

Papanicolas has held positions at the French Atomic Energy Commission (Saclay, France) and has was Professor of Physics at the University of Illinois (Urbana-Champaign, USA) and at the University of Athens (Greece). He has was the founding director of the Institute of Accelerating Systems and Applications (IASA) in Greece. Since 2008, he has been president of The Cyprus Institute (CyI) and CEO of the Cyprus Research and Educational Foundation (CREF). In 2019, he was appointed as advisor to the president of the Republic of Cyprus and special envoy on climate change.

During his career he held a numerous positions in various organizations. He was a member of the interim governing board and co-chair of the technical committee for the SESAME (Jordan), chair of the appointments committee for the establishment of the Department of Natural Sciences of the University of Cyprus, and chair of the Council on Educational Evaluation and Accreditation (CEEA) of the Republic of Cyprus. He was a member of the National Advisory Council for Research and the National Council for Research and Technology of Greece. He was chair of the Cyprus-CERN Committee, vice-chair of the Cyprus Scientific Council, the senior advisory scientific body to the Cyprus government, and a member of the National Research Council of Cyprus which is chaired by the president of the Republic of Cyprus.

Publications and awards 
Papanicolas has over 120 publications in peer-reviewed journals, numerous conference proceedings and holds two patents (in medical physics and solar energy).  He is a fellow of the American Physical Society and a member of Academia Europaea, a member of the Silk Road Academy of Sciences (China), and a founding member of the Cyprus Academy of Sciences, Letters and  the Arts. He has received numerous awards, including the  bestowment  of a "Medal of Excellence for Service to the Cyprus Republic" and the decoration as "Commendatore dell’Ordine della Stella d’Italia".

References

Cypriot scientists
Living people
1950 births
People associated with CERN
Fellows of the American Physical Society